Right atrial enlargement (RAE) is a form of cardiomegaly, or heart enlargement. It can broadly be classified as either right atrial hypertrophy (RAH), overgrowth, or dilation, like an expanding balloon. Common causes include pulmonary hypertension, which can be the primary defect leading to RAE, or pulmonary hypertension secondary to tricuspid stenosis; pulmonary stenosis or Tetralogy of Fallot i.e. congenital diseases; chronic lung disease, such as cor pulmonale. Other recognised causes are: right ventricular failure, tricuspid regurgitation, and atrial septal defect.

Diagnosis
It is characterized by a high P wave amplitude (P pulmonale), i.e. a height greater than 2.5 mm in inferior ECG leads (II, III, aVF); and greater than 1.5 mm in right sided precordial leads (V1, V2). 

Large "a" waves on the JVP waveform can also aid in diagnosis.

References

Cardiomegaly